Sizwe is a South African given name that may refer to
Sizwe Mabizela, South African academic
Sizwe Masondo (born 1987), South African cricketer
Sizwe Motaung (1970–2001), South African football player 
Sizwe Mpofu-Walsh (born 1989), South African author, musician and activist
Sizwe Ndlovu (born 1980), South African rower 
Sizwe Nxasana (born 1957), South African businessman
Sizwe Zakho, South African born music producer